Diogo de Vasconcelos is a city in the microregion of Ouro Preto in the Brazilian state of Minas Gerais.  As of 2020, the estimated population was 3,790.

See also 
 List of municipalities in Minas Gerais

References

Municipalities in Minas Gerais